Sylvia Whitman (April 1, 1981) is the proprietor of the Shakespeare and Company in Paris, the celebrated bohemian bookstore known for welcoming readers and writers from around the world.

She is the daughter of the shop's founder, the late George Whitman.

Biography 
Whitman is the only child of George Whitman, who in 1951 founded the Shakespeare and Company bookstore located at 37 rue de la Bûcherie in Paris. Her mother was Felicity Leng, a young British woman who had a brief marriage with George. According to author Jeremy Mercer, she was named after St. Sylvia, but George soon started maintaining she was named after Sylvia Beach, who had opened the original Shakespeare and Company (1919–1941), and he stated in one bookstore publication that her name was Sylvia Beach Whitman.

She began co-managing Shakespeare and Company with her father in 2003 at age 22. She continues to run it today with her partner, David Delannet, in the same manner her father had, allowing young writers to live in the bookstore in exchange for helping out around the shop, agreeing to read a book a day, and writing a one-page autobiography for the shop's archives. An estimated 30,000 people have stayed at the shop.

In 2003, Whitman founded a biennial literary festival, FestivalandCo, which has hosted such writers as Paul Auster, Siri Hustvedt, Jeanette Winterson, Jung Chang, and Marjane Satrapi.

In 2010, Shakespeare and Company launched The Paris Literary Prize for unpublished novellas, with a 10,000 euro prize donated by the de Groot Foundation. The winner of the first competition was Rosa Rankin-Gee, whose entry was subsequently published by Virago.

Partnering with Bob’s Bake Shop, Whitman and David Delannet opened a café in 2015, located next door to the shop in what had been an abandoned garage since 1981. The Shakespeare and Company Café serves primarily vegetarian food, with vegan and gluten-free options.

In 2016, the bookstore published its own history in a book titled Shakespeare and Company, Paris: A History of the Rag & Bone Shop of the Heart (edited by Krista Halverson), which features an epilogue by Whitman, as well as a foreword by Jeanette Winterson.

Media appearances 
Whitman was featured in a 2012 episode of Sundance Beginnings, directed by Chiara Clemente.

She appeared on the Paris episodes of The Late Late Show with Craig Ferguson, which aired the week of August 1, 2011.

She is featured in the 2014 BBC television documentary Bright Lights, Brilliant Minds: A Tale of Three Cities. episode 2. Paris 1928 by Dr. James Fox.

She appears in an episode of the BBC television series Imagine, first broadcast in 2012: 'Jeanette Winterson: My Monster and Me'.

References

External links 
 Shakespeareandcompany.com
 "In a Bookstore in Paris," Vanity Fair, November 2014
 Sylvia Whitman on Sundance Beginnings
 
 Interview December 2020

Living people
1981 births
British booksellers
French booksellers
Businesspeople from Paris